Gargoyle is a name shared by two fictional characters appearing in American comic books published by Marvel Comics.

Publication history
The first Gargoyle, Yuri Topolov, appears in The Incredible Hulk #1 (May 1962), and was created by Stan Lee and Jack Kirby.

The appearance of Gargoyle in Rampaging Hulk #1 is merely part of one of Bereet's fictional techno-art films. The first Gargoyle received an entry in The Official Handbook of the Marvel Universe Deluxe Edition #17, where his real name was revealed.

The second Gargoyle, Isaac Christians, is a human/demon hybrid and a member of the Defenders. He was created by writer J. M. DeMatteis and artist Don Perlin. Perlin's design was inspired by a sequence in Prince Valiant in which the titular hero disguises himself as a gargoyle. During his long run on The Defenders, Gargoyle also was the co-star of Marvel Team-Up #119, written by his co-creator DeMatteis, who later described the issue as "one of my favorite favorite stories".

In 1985 Marvel published a four-issue Gargoyle limited series, written by DeMatteis and drawn by Mark Badger. DeMatteis said of the series, "It was a psychological fantasy. You take the interior life and make it concrete... give it substance... and play with it". Explaining why he decided to do a limited series starring Gargoyle, he said, 

In a 2013 interview DeMatteis said that Gargoyle "is a character I still have tremendous fondness for".

Fictional character biography

Gargoyle (Yuri Topolov)

Yuri Topolov is a Soviet scientist and the Hulk's first foe. An atomic accident caused from working with radiation that mutated him into a grotesque large-headed dwarf. The Gargoyle was informed about the Hulk by an imprisoned spy using a miniature transmitter. By firing a gun with will-weakening pellets, he succeeded in capturing both him and Rick Jones. Bruce Banner cured him of his mutation via gamma rays. He gratefully used his rocket to send them back into the United States. Topolov managed to destroy several Soviet generals and 'die like a man' in an explosion he set off. However, he passed this deformity onto his son, the Gremlin.

Topolov later turned up alive, because of his own deliberate fake death. He was frozen by the USSR in a cryogenic sleep near the Cold War's end, along with some other agents. They were accidentally awakened in this modern day and fought the Order.

Powers and abilities
As the first Gargoyle, Yuri Topolov was a superhuman genius. Either human or mutate, he knows numerous sciences and is well-versed in mechanical theory. He utilizes a pellet gun with will-sapping effects.

Gargoyle II (Isaac Christians)

Isaac Christians was an elderly man who sold his soul to an alliance of minor demons styling themselves as "The Six-Fingered Hand" in exchange for prosperity for the dying hometown that his ancestors had founded (the fictional town of Christiansboro, Virginia). Christians made a pact with the demon Avarrish to inhabit the body of a legendary gargoyle and act as an agent of the Six-Fingered Hand. The demons of the Six-Fingered Hand transferred Christians' life force into the Gargoyle body and sent him on a mission to capture Patsy Walker, at that time operating as Defenders member Hellcat. Christians battled the Defenders, but rebelled against the Six-Fingered Hand. He was trapped in the gargoyle's body, but joined the Defenders. The Defenders then helped him defeat the Six-Fingered Hand.

As a member of the Defenders, Gargoyle helped the Squadron Supreme defeat the Overmind and Null the Living Darkness. The Gargoyle briefly fell under the control of an Afghan wizard, and he was forced to battle the Defenders.

Christians later returned to Christianboro, and was later released from the Gargoyle body and the original demon spirit re-inhabited it. Christians, to prevent the chaos being wreaked by the gargoyle, re-assumed the body with the help of a druid and killed his original human body to prevent the demon from returning.

Moondragon, under the influence of the Dragon of the Moon, later separated Christians' life force from the gargoyle body. The body was to be used as a vessel for the Dragon of the Moon, and it became larger and more grotesque. The gargoyle body was carbonized and transformed into a statue of ash, when the Defenders defeated Moondragon and the Dragon of the Moon.

Christians' life force came to reside in a crystal talisman. He reconciled with the spirit of Moondragon, and journeyed with Pamela Douglas to Titan, where he witnessed the rebirth of Moondragon. The former Defender known as Cloud created a new body for Christians, with the ability to switch between his gargoyle and human forms at will.

Alongside the Presence, Starlight, Jack of Hearts, and others, he returned to Earth from the Stranger's laboratory world.

When the final confrontation between Gabriel, Devil Hunter, and Hellstrom left Gabriel irretrievably insane, only capable of babbling incoherently, Hellstrom left him in the care of the Gargoyle.

Following the "Civil War" storyline, Christians was one of the registered superhumans seen in Avengers: The Initiative #1. He was shown flying in an attack against HYDRA; this helped save the President from an assassination attempt. He is shown in battle against KIA. Gargoyle was also seen aiding Hellcat. He ignored Nighthawk's offer to join the Last Defenders and remained at Camp Hammond to serve as an instructor training the Initiative cadets before retiring. He returns to assist in defeating a deranged copy of Thor called 'Ragnarok'.

Alyosha Kravinoff later captured Gargoyle and placed him in his zoo for animal-themed superhumans which also consisted of Bushmaster, Tiger Shark, Kangaroo, Aragorn (the version that was owned by the Vatican Black Knight), Vulture, Mongoose, Man-Bull, Dragon Man, Swarm, Mandrill, Grizzly, Frog-Man, and Rhino.

Isaac Christians later opened up a restaurant called Isaac's Oysters in Greenwich with Eugene Patilio as his busboy. Both of them were approached by Iron Man for help in rescuing James Rhodes from Korvac.

Powers and abilities
The second Gargoyle is the result due to a magical transfer of Isaac Christians' spirit into an ancient gargoyle body. In this form, Gargoyle possesses supernatural strength and durability, as well as a thick leathery hide. He has the ability to manipulate "biomystical" energy for numerous effects, such as shapeshifting, concussive blasts, and fear inducement. He could siphon life-forces from other people, causing temporary debilitating weakness onto them. Surrounding himself in a mystical field granted Gargoyle immunity to certain spells. Gargoyle is able to fly via levitation (his wings were incapable of producing sufficient lift, but useful for navigation). Christians can regrow lost or damaged limbs, even although they would differ wildly in appearance from the original. Overexpenditure of these energies in such a short time might weaken or even kill him. Not only that, he could also be commanded to act against his will by an evil wizard who spoke a particular obscure spell. Christians was a student in the occult with minor mystic capabilities. Prior to his transformation, he had considerable knowledge of magic, including rudimentary spellcasting and summoning demons.

In other media

Television
 The Yuri Topolov version of Gargoyle appeared in the Hulk segment of The Marvel Super Heroes, but he was called the Gorgon and not the Gargoyle in the TV version of the comic.
 The Yuri Topolov version of Gargoyle appeared in the 1996 The Incredible Hulk series, voiced by Mark Hamill. Gargoyle is always trying to find a cure for his mutation even allying himself with Leader. In the episode "Mortal Bounds", he accidentally released a gamma virus (infecting amongst others Betty Ross) in his search for a cure where he was restored to a near normal state yet also infected. When Betty Ross was dying from the virus, Gargoyle gave Bruce Banner the antidote as Gargoyle is also cured. Before leaving, Gargoyle warns Banner that the next time they met he would not be so favorable. His position with Leader was one of grudging subservience, although he did become the dominant member when Leader temporarily lost his powers at the beginning of season two. From then on like MODOK in the Iron Man animated series, he became the bumbling comic relief with a crush on She-Hulk.

Video games
The Yuri Topolov version of Gargoyle appears in Lego Marvel's Avengers.

Collected editions

References

External links
 
 
 Gargoyle (Isaac Christians) at Marvel.com

Characters created by J. M. DeMatteis
Comics characters introduced in 1963
Comics characters introduced in 1981
Characters created by Jack Kirby
Characters created by Stan Lee
Fictional characters from Virginia
Fictional characters with dwarfism
Fictional characters with slowed ageing
Fictional characters with superhuman durability or invulnerability
Fictional communists
Fictional Russian people
Fictional Soviet people
Gargoyles in popular culture
Marvel Comics characters who are shapeshifters
Marvel Comics characters who use magic
Marvel Comics characters with accelerated healing
Marvel Comics characters with superhuman strength
Marvel Comics demons
Marvel Comics mutates
Marvel Comics superheroes
Marvel Comics supervillains

it:Gargoyle (personaggio)